The White Warrior is a 1959 adventure film directed by Riccardo Freda. It is loosely based on Lev Tolstoy's posthumously published 1912 novel Hadji Murat.

Cast 
Steve Reeves: Agi Murad, the "White Warrior"
Giorgia Moll: Sultanet
Scilla Gabel: Princess Maria Vorontsova
Renato Baldini: Ahmed Khan
Gérard Herter: Prince Sergei
Milivoje Živanović: Tsar Nicholas I

Production
During the filming of parts of the final showdown Alan Steel doubled Steve Reeves.

Release
The White Warrior was released in Italy on 21 June 1959 where it was distributed by Lux Film. The film grossed a total of 483,160,000 Italian lire domestically.

See also
 List of Italian films of 1959

References

Footnotes

Sources

External links

1959 films
Italian historical adventure films
Films directed by Riccardo Freda
1950s historical adventure films
Films set in Russia
Films set in the 19th century
Films based on works by Leo Tolstoy
Films based on short fiction
Lux Film films
Cultural depictions of Nicholas I of Russia
1950s Italian films